The Easton–River de Chute Border Crossing connects the towns of Easton, Maine and Wicklow, New Brunswick on the Canada–US border. Historically, two roads entered Easton from Canada, but in the late 1950s, the Canada closed its Beaconsfield crossing on Nicholson Road, so the US government moved its border station from its original location near the intersection of Ladner and Curtis Roads. After the move, the US Customs Service operated out of at least three different mobile trailers until 2012, when it finally constructed a permanent border inspection station.

The crossing is open for limited hours every day; the nearby Fort Fairfield–Andover Border Crossing is open 24 hours a day. About 4,000 crossings use the station a year, or an average of fewer than 11 a day.

See also
 List of Canada–United States border crossings

References

Canada–United States border crossings
Transportation buildings and structures in Aroostook County, Maine
1936 establishments in Maine
1936 establishments in New Brunswick
Carleton County, New Brunswick